Ram Sewak may refer to one of the following people:
Ram Sewak Chowdhary, Indian politician
Ram Sewak Hazari (1936–2012), Indian politician
Ram Sewak Paikra (born 1962), Indian politician 
Ram Sewak Sharma (born 1955), Indian bureaucrat
Ram Sewak Yadav, Indian politician